Ragip Jashari  (Serbo-Croat: Ragip Jašari) (November 11, 1961 – April 19, 1999), was an Albanian politician and patriot.

Early life and political activities 

Ragip Jashari was born in a village in the municipality of Lipljan, FPR Yugoslavia. He was an activist for liberation of Kosovo and because of that most of his life was persecuted by Yugoslavian government. As president of the youth in Lipljan in 1988-1989, he objected the constitution of 1974 by supporting the 1989 Kosovo miners' strike in Kosovska Mitrovica. This was a political step to favour the promptness of Kosovo youth for independence of the land.

This act was the cause for many political changes in the Lipljan government causing Jashari to leave Kosovo and ask for political asylum in Germany. During the time in Germany, Yugoslav political twice tried to assassinate him.

In March 1998, he left Germany and returned to Kosovo where the war against FR Yugoslavia had started. 

After his return on April 19, 1999, he was executed in his birthplace, Mali Alas. On the same day, his home was burnt along with all his manuscripts, novels, poetry and documents.

External links  
 ragipjashari.wetpaint.com - 
 ragipjashari-kos.blogspot.com - 

1961 births
1999 deaths
People from Lipljan
Kosovo Albanians
Kosovan politicians